ǃKheis is an administrative area in the ZF Mgcawu District of Northern Cape in South Africa. ǃKheis is a Khoi name meaning "a place where you live, or a home". The municipality is named in recognition of the Khoi people who were the first permanent dwellers of the area.

Main places
The 2001 census divided the municipality into the following main places:

Politics 

The municipal council consists of eleven members elected by mixed-member proportional representation. Six councillors are elected by first-past-the-post voting in six wards, while the remaining five are chosen from party lists so that the total number of party representatives is proportional to the number of votes received. In the election of 1 November 2021 no party obtained a majority of seats on the council.

The following table shows the results of the election.

Economy 
As of 2020, 500 homes are powered by solar panels with battery storage.

References

External links
 Official website

Local municipalities of the ZF Mgcawu District Municipality